The popoche chub (Algansea popoche) is a species of freshwater ray-finned fish in the genus Algansea of the family Cyprinidae. It is endemic to the Lake Chapala and nearby sections of associated rivers in Jalisco of west-central Mexico. Although considered threatened, it can be locally numerous. It is generally not considered a food fish.

References

Algansea
Fish described in 1899
Freshwater fish of Mexico
Endemic fish of Mexico
Taxa named by David Starr Jordan